is a railway station in Chūō-ku, Fukuoka in Japan. Its station symbol is a track and field athlete in red be looks like "ア" which is Akasaka's initials, in connection with the annual Fukuoka Marathon, which starts and finishes at Heiwadai Athletic Stadium, located 600 m from this station.

Lines
Akasaka Station is served by the Fukuoka City Subway Kūkō Line.

Platforms

History
The station opened on 26 July 1981.

Surrounding area
Fukuoka Central District Office
Fukuoka Transportation Bureau
Maizuru Park
Korokan Ruins, Exhibition Hall (formerly Heiwadai Stadium)
Fukuoka Castle
Heiwadai Athleic Stadium
Fukuoka High Court
Fukuoka District Court
Fukuoka Legal Affairs Bureau
Fukuoka Public Prosecutors Office
Fukuoka Central Employment Office
Central City Health Center
Fukuoka City Civic Center
Fukuoka Central Fish Wholesale Market

References

Kūkō Line (Fukuoka City Subway)
Railway stations in Fukuoka Prefecture
Railway stations in Japan opened in 1981
Railway stations in Japan opened in 1982